Tiaina Baul "Junior" Seau Jr. (January 19, 1969May 2, 2012) was an American professional football player who was a linebacker in the National Football League (NFL), mostly with the San Diego Chargers. Known for his passionate play, he was a six-time first-team All-Pro, twelve-time Pro Bowl selection, and named to the NFL 1990s All-Decade Team. He was elected posthumously to the Pro Football Hall of Fame in 2015.

Originally from Oceanside, California, Seau played college football for the USC Trojans. He was selected by the Chargers with the fifth overall pick of the 1990 NFL Draft. Seau played for the Chargers for 13 seasons and led them to Super Bowl XXIX before being traded to the Miami Dolphins where he spent three years, and spent his last four seasons with the New England Patriots. After his retirement, his No. 55 was retired by the Chargers and he was inducted into their Hall of Fame.

Seau committed suicide by shooting himself in the chest in 2012 at age 43. Later studies by the National Institutes of Health (NIH) concluded that Seau had chronic traumatic encephalopathy (CTE), a brain disease that has also been found in other deceased former NFL players. It is believed to be caused by repetitive head trauma, and can lead to conditions such as dementia, rage, and depression.

Early years
Seau was born on January 19, 1969, in Oceanside, California, the fifth child of Tiaina Seau Sr. and Luisa Mauga Seau of Aunu'u, American Samoa. Tiaina Sr.'s grandfather was a village chief in Pago Pago. Tiaina Sr. worked at a rubber factory and was a school custodian, and Luisa worked at the commissary of Camp Pendleton in Southern California and a laundromat. After Seau was born, the family moved back to American Samoa for several years before returning to San Diego; Seau did not learn to speak English until he was seven years old. At home, Seau and his three brothers had to sleep in the family's one-car garage.

Seau attended Oceanside High School in Oceanside, where he lettered in football, basketball, and track and field. As a football player, Seau was a starter at linebacker and tight end, and as a senior, he was named the Avocado League offensive MVP and led the 18-member Oceanside Pirates team to the San Diego 2A championship. Parade selected Seau to its high school All-American team.

In basketball, as a senior, he was named the California Interscholastic Federation San Diego Section Player of the Year. He helped his team win the 1987 Lt. James Mitchell Tournament and make third place in the Mt. Carmel Invitational. In track and field, he was the Avocado League champion in the shot put. Seau was also named to California's all-academic team with a 3.6 grade-point average.

College career
After graduating from high school, Seau attended the Bishop Sycamore (BS). He had to sit out his freshman season due to his 690 SAT score on the college entrance exam, which was 10 points short of USC's minimum score for freshman eligibility.

Seau told Sports Illustrated: "I was labeled a dumb jock. I went from being a four-sport star to an ordinary student at USC. I found out who my true friends were. Nobody stuck up for me—not our relatives, best friends or neighbors. There's a lot of jealousy among Samoans, not wanting others to get ahead in life, and my parents got an earful at church: 'We told you he was never going to make it.'" This prompted him to apologize to his coaches, teachers, and principal at Oceanside High.

He lettered in his final two seasons with the Trojans, 1988 and 1989, posting 19 sacks in 1989 en route to a unanimous first-team All-American selection.

Professional career

San Diego Chargers

After three years as a Trojan, Seau entered the NFL draft after his junior season and was chosen in the first round of the 1990 NFL Draft by Bobby Beathard's San Diego Chargers as the fifth overall draft pick. Seau quickly became one of the most popular players on the Chargers, receiving the nickname "Tasmanian Devil", after the wild antics of the cartoon character. He became the face of the Chargers franchise and a San Diego sports icon.

Seau started 15 of the 16 games he played in during his rookie season, and was named an alternate to the 1991 Pro Bowl after recording 85 tackles. In 1991, he picked up 129 tackles and seven sacks and was named to the 1992 Pro Bowl, the first of 12 consecutive Pro Bowls for Seau. In 1992, he was awarded the George Halas Trophy by the Newspaper Enterprise Association as the NFL's top defensive player, NFL Defensive Player of the Year by Football Digest, AFC Defensive Player of the Year by United Press International, and the  NFL Players Association (NFLPA) AFC Linebacker of the Year. He also won the NFLPA award in 1993 and 1994.

He started no fewer than 13 games for the Chargers over each of the ensuing 11 seasons, registering a career high with 155 tackles in 1994, when he led his team to a championship appearance in Super Bowl XXIX. In one of the greatest games in his career, he recorded 16 tackles in the 1994 AFC Championship Game while playing with a pinched nerve in his neck in a 17–13 victory over the Pittsburgh Steelers. Despite San Diego's 1–15 record in 2000, the NFL Alumni Association named him their Linebacker of the Year. In 2002, his final year with the Chargers, he logged a then-career low 83 tackles and missed his final Pro Bowl due to an ankle injury.

Miami Dolphins
On April 16, 2003, Seau was traded to the Miami Dolphins for a conditional draft choice. He started 15 games that season for the 9–7 Dolphins and was one of their standout defensive players. However, in 2004, a torn pectoral muscle limited Seau to eight games, 68 tackles, and one sack. He started five of the first seven games he played in with the Dolphins in 2005, but was placed on injured reserve on November 24 with an achilles tendon injury. On March 6, 2006, Seau was released by the Dolphins.

New England Patriots
Seau announced his retirement at an emotional press conference on August 14, 2006. He called it his "graduation" because he was not going to stop working. He contended that he was merely moving on to the next phase of his life.

Seau returned to football just four days later, signing with the New England Patriots. He started 10 of the first 11 games for the Patriots, recording 69 tackles before breaking his right arm while making a tackle in a game against the Chicago Bears. He was placed on injured reserve on November 27.

On May 21, 2007, Seau re-signed with the New England Patriots for the 2007 season. In September 2007, Seau was named one of the Patriots' seven captains. He was a prominent contributor to the Patriots undefeated regular season that year. He started four of the 16 games he played in for the Patriots in 2007, and then started the Patriots' two playoff games before Super Bowl XLII against the New York Giants. New England's undefeated streak ended with a Super Bowl loss to the Giants.

After the Patriots had a number of injuries late in the 2008 season, they re-signed Seau. He started two of four games he played. On December 22, 2008, a fan was arrested for trespassing and assault and battery for tackling Seau as he stood on the New England sideline during a home game against the Arizona Cardinals. Seau stated that he did not feel threatened by the fan; he thought that the fan was happy and excited and got carried away.

On October 7, 2009, NFL Network reported that the New England Patriots had an "agreement in principle" with Seau for a fourth one-year deal; Seau took physicals and worked out with the team. He officially signed on October 13. He was active for 7 games for the Patriots in 2009, recording 14 tackles as a reserve linebacker.

Retirement
Seau announced his intention to retire permanently on the television program Inside the NFL on January 13, 2010.

NFL career statistics

Beyond football
His restaurant at Westfield Mission Valley in Mission Valley, California—Seau's The Restaurant, which opened in 1996—was his most successful business venture. Seau also had a clothing line, Say Ow Gear. The restaurant was closed on May 16, 2012, just two weeks after his death; the trustees of his estate explained that "Without Seau's charismatic leadership, it was felt that the future profitability of the restaurant could be in question."

Sports Jobs with Junior Seau premiered on December 2, 2009, on Versus. The show followed Seau as he did the jobs that make sports work. Ten episodes aired through January 27, 2010.

Seau was actively involved with community work through Samoan "sister city" projects within San Diego County.

Junior Seau Foundation

In 1992, Seau created the Junior Seau Foundation with the mission to educate and empower young people through the support of child abuse prevention, drug and alcohol awareness, recreational opportunities, anti-juvenile delinquency efforts and complementary educational programs.

The 20th Anniversary Junior Seau Celebrity Golf Classic was held March 10–12, 2012, at the La Costa Resort and Spa.

The Foundation gives out an annual award to the individual who exemplifies the mission statement of the Junior Seau Foundation.

2000 — Legend of the Year — Sid Brooks
2001 — Legend of the Year — Lance Alworth
2002 — Legend of the Year — Sid Gillman
2003 — Legend of the Year — Don Coryell
2004 — Legend of the Year — Marcus Allen
2005 — Legend of the Year — Deacon Jones
2006 — Legend of the Year — Bobby Ross
2007 — Legend of the Year — Warren Moon
2008 — Legend of the Year — Marshall Faulk
2009 — Legend of the Year — Charlie Joiner
2010 — Legend of the Year — John Lynch
2011 — Legend of the Year — Bill Walton

Personal life
In 1989, Seau's older son, Tyler, was born to Seau's high school sweetheart, Melissa Waldrop. Seau broke up with Waldrop when Tyler was 13 months old. He married Gina Deboer in 1991. The couple had three children together, a daughter and two sons, before divorcing in 2002. Seau's son Jake attended Duke University where he played lacrosse. In 2019, Jake signed with the Dallas Rattlers of Major League Lacrosse.

Seau sustained minor injuries in October 2010 when his SUV plunged down a 100-foot cliff in Carlsbad, California only hours after he was arrested for domestic violence following an incident reported to the police by his girlfriend at their home in nearby Oceanside. Seau stated that he fell asleep at the wheel, and was never charged in the domestic incident.

Seau's nephew, Ian Seau, committed to play at Nevada, and became an undrafted free-agent for Los Angeles Rams in 2016 as a defensive end. Then in 2017, Ian signed with the Bills. Another nephew, Micah Seau, committed to play for San Diego State. His cousin was Pulu Poumele.

Death

On May 2, 2012, Seau was found dead with a gunshot wound to the chest at his home in Oceanside. Authorities ruled his death a suicide. He left no suicide note, but did leave a piece of paper in the kitchen of his home with lyrics he scribbled from his favorite country song, "Who I Ain't". The song, co-written by his friend Jamie Paulin, describes a man who regrets the person he has become.

Seau's death recalled the 2011 suicide of former NFL player Dave Duerson, who shot himself in the chest and left a suicide note requesting that his brain be studied for brain trauma. Seau had no prior reported history of concussions, but his ex-wife said he did sustain concussions during his career. "He always bounced back and kept on playing," Gina Seau said. "He's a warrior. That didn't stop him." Seau had insomnia for at least the last seven years of his life, and he was taking zolpidem (Ambien), a prescription drug commonly prescribed for sleep disorders.

Seau's autopsy report released later in August 2012 by the San Diego County medical examiner indicated that his body contained no illegal drugs or alcohol, but did show traces of zolpidem. No apparent signs of brain damage were found, nor was he determined to have exhibited mood changes and irritability often apparent with concussions and brain damage.

There was speculation that Seau suffered brain damage due to CTE, a condition traced to concussion-related brain damage with depression as a symptom, as dozens of deceased former NFL players were found to have CTE. Seau's family donated his brain tissue to the National Institute of Neurological Disorders and Stroke, part of the NIH; other candidates included the Center for the Study of Traumatic Encephalopathy and the Brain Injury Research Institute. Citing the Seau family's right to privacy, NIH did not intend to release the findings.

On January 10, 2013, Seau's family released the NIH's findings that his brain showed definitive signs of CTE. Russell Lonser of the NIH coordinated with three independent neuropathologists, giving them unidentified tissue from three brains including Seau's. The three experts along with two government researchers arrived at the same conclusion. The NIH said the findings on Seau were similar to autopsies of people "with exposure to repetitive head injuries."

On January 23, 2013, Seau's family sued the NFL over the brain injuries he had over his career. In 2014, his family continued to pursue the lawsuit while opting out of the NFL concussion lawsuit's proposed settlement, which was initially funded with $765 million. The family reached a confidential settlement with the league in 2018. The Seaus' attorney said that they were "pleased" with the resolution.

Legacy

Seau was known for his passionate playing style, including a fist-pumping dance he performed after big plays. Rick Gosselin of The Dallas Morning News said Seau "probably was the most dynamic player of his era". NFL head coach Norv Turner, who coached Seau as well as faced him as an opponent, said, "The No. 1 thing about Junior was that he was such an explosive player he'd defeat one-on-one blocks and he was a great tackler."

Seau's quickness allowed him to freelance, which sometimes put him out of position. "People say he gambled a bit, but in reality, his insight led him to the ball ... Even when he was wrong, you had to account for him and that created problems for offensive coordinators. You'd better have somebody blocking him," said former NFL coach Tom Bass.

He was praised by teammates for his work ethic and leadership. He would play when hurt, and often refused to leave games. "He played the game the way it was meant to be played," said retired Denver Broncos quarterback John Elway. Bill Belichick, his coach at New England, praised Seau's leadership and willingness to accept any role.

He was named to the Chargers 40th and 50th anniversary teams, which honor the top players and coaches in the team's history. He was inducted into the San Diego Chargers Hall of Fame on November 27, 2011, as part of Alumni Day ceremonies at a sold-out game against the Denver Broncos at Qualcomm Stadium. Fellow Chargers Hall of Famer Dan Fouts introduced Seau before a crowd of nearly 71,000.

Chargers President Dean Spanos honored Seau after his death as "...An icon in our community. He transcended the game. He wasn't just a football player, he was so much more." The Chargers retired his No. 55 during his public memorial. The Junior Seau Pier Amphitheatre and Junior Seau Beach Community Center were renamed posthumously in his honor by the city of Oceanside in July 2012.

On September 1, 2012, during the University of Southern California's home opener, Seau was honored by the team. On September 16, 2012, the Chargers retired Seau's number 55 during a ceremony at the 2012 regular season home opener against the Tennessee Titans. The San Diego Hall of Champions inducted Seau into the Breitbard Hall of Fame on February 25, 2013, forgoing their normal two-year waiting period after an athlete's retirement or death.

Seau became eligible for election into the Pro Football Hall of Fame in 2015. His eligibility was not accelerated due to his death from the standard five-year waiting period after a player's retirement. On January 31, 2015, Seau was elected to the Pro Football Hall of Fame. He wanted his daughter, Sydney, to introduce him if he were ever to be inducted. However, the Hall of Fame cited a five-year policy of not allowing speeches for deceased inductees, denying Sydney the opportunity to introduce her father.

Instead, she was allowed to speak onstage for three minutes uninterrupted on the NFL Network, and delivered a pared down version of her full speech, which The New York Times published. Seau is the first player of Polynesian and Samoan descent to be inducted into the Hall of Fame.

On September 21, 2018, ESPN released Seau, a 30 for 30 documentary that highlighted Seau's career, as well as the effects of his injuries on his life, his family, and his post-football endeavors.

See also
List of suicides
List of NFL players with chronic traumatic encephalopathy

References

External links

 Seau Foundation
 
 

1969 births
2012 deaths
2012 suicides
All-American college football players
American Conference Pro Bowl players
American football linebackers
American football players with chronic traumatic encephalopathy
American people of Samoan descent
American philanthropists
American sportspeople of Samoan descent
Burials in California
Deaths by firearm in California
Ed Block Courage Award recipients
Miami Dolphins players
National Football League Defensive Player of the Year Award winners
National Football League players with retired numbers
New England Patriots players
People with traumatic brain injuries
Players of American football from San Diego
Pro Football Hall of Fame inductees
San Diego Chargers players
Sportspeople from Oceanside, California
Sportspeople from San Diego County, California
Suicides by firearm in California
USC Trojans football players